Tal Barahi temple also known as ‘Lake Temple’ or ‘Barahi Temple’ is a Hindu temple of the goddess Barahi. It is the most important religious monument in Pokhara, Nepal. This temple is located on a small island in the middle of Phewa Lake. As the temple is situated on a small island, the only way to visit it is by boat. The temple is a symbol of manifestation of Ajima representing the female force. Devotees visit the temple in the Nepalese months of Baisakh (April-May) and Kartik (November-December).

Archaeology
The original structure of the temple is made from stones and has a two-story thatched roof with pagoda style

Gallery

See also 
 Bindhyabasini Temple
 Bhadrakali Temple
 List of Hindu temples in Nepal

References

Hindu temples in Gandaki Province
Kaski District
Temples in Pokhara